Monistria is a genus of grasshoppers in the family Pyrgomorphidae and the tribe Monistriini. Species are found Australia, New Zealand and surrounding islands.

Species
The Catalogue of Life and Orthoptera Species File list the following:
Monistria cicatricosa Rehn, 1953
Monistria concinna Walker, 1871
Monistria consobrina Key, 1985
Monistria discrepans Walker, 1871
Monistria latevittata Sjöstedt, 1921
Monistria maculicornis Sjöstedt, 1921
Monistria pavoninae Rehn, 1953
Monistria picta Sjöstedt, 1921
Monistria pustulifera Walker, 1871
Monistria sulcata Tepper, 1896

Gallery

References

External links

Caelifera genera
Pyrgomorphidae